The 2013 ICC Women's World Twenty20 Qualifier was an international cricket tournament held in Dublin, Ireland, from 23 July to 1 August 2013. The tournament was the inaugural edition of the Women's World Twenty20 Qualifier, with the top three teams advancing to the 2014 World Twenty20 in Bangladesh.

Eight teams played in the tournament. The host, Ireland, was joined by the two lowest-placed teams from the 2012 World Twenty20, Pakistan and Sri Lanka, as well as five teams from regional qualifying tournaments. Pakistan and Sri Lanka both went on to be undefeated at the tournament, sharing the title after the final was interrupted by rain. Ireland defeated the Netherlands in the third-place playoff to also qualify for the World Twenty20.

Qualification and format
Originally, the ICC had determined that only the winner of the tournament would qualify for the World Twenty20, with that tournament then having only eight teams. This decision was altered at the 2013 International Cricket Council (ICC) annual conference in June 2013, as part of a concerted effort to support women's cricket. The eight teams at the qualifier were divided into two groups based on their ranking, with the four teams that failed to make the semi-finals going on to participate in a repêchage tournament (the Shield).

Squads

Group stages

Source: ESPNcricinfo

Group A

Group B

Source: ESPNcricinfo

Shield competition

Shield semi-finals

Shield third-place playoff

Shield final

Main finals

Semi-finals

Third-place playoff

Final

Statistics

Most runs
The top five run scorers (total runs) are included in this table.

Source: CricketArchive

Most wickets

The top five wicket takers are listed in this table, listed by wickets taken and then by bowling average.

Source: CricketArchive

Final standing

Notes

References

External links
 ESPNcricinfo tournament site

International cricket competitions in 2013
Cricket
Cricket
International women's cricket competitions in Ireland
2014 ICC Women's World Twenty20
July 2013 sports events in Europe
August 2013 sports events in Europe
2010s in Dublin (city)
2013 in Irish cricket